Sharypovo is a town in Krasnoyarsk Krai, Russia, located on the Beresh River (Chulym's basin),  west of Krasnoyarsk. Population:

History
It was founded in the second half of the 18th century as a village and later grew into a selo. Town status was granted to it in 1981. In 1985–1988, it was called Chernenko, after the General Secretary of the Communist Party of the Soviet Union Konstantin Chernenko, who was born here.

Administrative and municipal status
Within the framework of administrative divisions, Sharypovo serves as the administrative center of Sharypovsky District, even though it is not a part of it. As an administrative division, it is, together with two urban-type settlements (Goryachegorsk and Dubinino), incorporated separately as the krai town of Sharypovo—an administrative unit with the status equal to that of the districts. As a municipal division, the krai town of Sharypovo is incorporated as Sharypovo Urban Okrug.

Points of interest
Beryozovskaya GRES

References

Notes

Sources

Cities and towns in Krasnoyarsk Krai
Sharypovo Urban Okrug
Yeniseysk Governorate